Edward Arthur Walsh (February 11, 1905 – October 31, 1937) was an American Major League Baseball pitcher from Meriden, Connecticut, and son of Hall of Famer Ed Walsh.  He played four seasons in the Majors, all with Chicago White Sox, from  through . Although he is not technically a "Junior" (his father's middle name was Augustine), he is generally referred to in sources as Ed Walsh Jr.

Career

After his graduation from the University of Notre Dame, where he also played college baseball, he joined the Chicago White Sox, the team that his father had become famous playing for years earlier. Over the first two years of his career, he spent most of time as a starting pitcher, with infrequent performances out of the bullpen. The following year, he was no longer part of the pitching rotation, and spent most of his time as a relief pitcher, appearing in 37 games, also without much success.

Before the  season, he was bought by Oakland Oaks of the Pacific Coast League, where he has the claim to fame for stopping young Joe Dimaggio's minor league record 61-game hitting streak.

Death

He suddenly became ill in late 1937, and he returned to his parents' home in Meriden, where he lapsed into a coma and died at the age of 32.  It was determined that he had suffered from an acute heart ailment caused by chronic rheumatism.  He was interred at Sacred Heart Cemetery in Meriden.

See also
List of second-generation Major League Baseball players

References

External links

1905 births
1937 deaths
Major League Baseball pitchers
Baseball players from Connecticut
Chicago White Sox players
Notre Dame Fighting Irish baseball players
People from Meriden, Connecticut